Sturton is an electoral ward in the district of Bassetlaw. The ward elects one councillor to Bassetlaw District Council using the first past the post electoral system for a four-year term in office. The number of registered voters in the ward is 1,850 as of 2019.

It consists of the villages of Bole, North Wheatley, North Leverton with Habblesthorpe, Sturton le Steeple and West Burton.

The ward was created in 2002 following a review of electoral boundaries in Bassetlaw by the Boundary Committee for England.

Councillors

The ward elects one councillor every four years. Prior to 2015, Bassetlaw District Council was elected by thirds with elections taking place every year except the year in which elections to Nottinghamshire County Council took place.

Elections

2019

2015

2011

2007

2003

2002

References

Wards of Nottinghamshire